Dominik Stolz (born 4 May 1990) is a German professional footballer who plays as a midfielder for Swift Hesperange.

References

External links
 
 

Living people
1990 births
Association football midfielders
German footballers
SpVgg Greuther Fürth II players
SpVgg Bayreuth players
SV Sandhausen players
F91 Dudelange players
FC Swift Hesperange players
2. Bundesliga players
Regionalliga players
Luxembourg National Division players